The 1988 New Year Honours in New Zealand were appointments by Elizabeth II on the advice of the New Zealand government to various orders and honours to reward and highlight good works by New Zealanders. The awards celebrated the passing of 1987 and the beginning of 1988, and were announced on 31 December 1987.

The recipients of honours are displayed here as they were styled before their new honour.

Knight Bachelor

 John Mokonuiarangi Bennett  – of Havelock North. For services to education.
 Ronald Alfred Brierley – of Wellington. For services to business management and the community.
 Murray Gordon Halberg  – of Waiheke Island. For services to sport and crippled children.
 The Honourable (Mr Justice) James Peter Quilliam – of Wellington; judge of the High Court.

Order of the Bath

Companion (CB)
Military division
 Air Vice-Marshal Patrick Neville  – Royal New Zealand Air Force; Chief of Air Staff.

Order of Saint Michael and Saint George

Dame Commander (DCMG)
 The Honourable (Margaret) Ann Hercus – of Christchurch. For public services.

Companion (CMG)
 Charles Frederick Sutton Caldwell – of Christchurch. For services to education and the community.
 John William Harris Clark – of Wainuiomata; Secretary of Trade and Industry.
 John Thomas Kneebone – of Tīrau. For public services and services to agriculture.

Order of the British Empire

Knight Commander (KBE)
Civil division
 Professor Philip John Scott – of Auckland. For services to medicine.

Commander (CBE)
Civil division
 The Honourable John Philip Cook   – of Christchurch; lately a judge of the High Court.
 Emeritus Professor Lloyd George Geering – of Wellington. For services to religious studies.
 Anne Therese Nightingale – of Auckland. For services to nursing.
 Professor John Derek Kingsley North – of Auckland. For services to medicine.
 John Hayward Oakley – of Lower Hutt. For services to cricket.
 William Leslie Renwick – of Wellington; Director-General of Education.
 Bernadette Mary Richardson – of Christchurch. For services to the community.

Military division
 Major-General Kenneth Montrose Gordon  – Generals' List, New Zealand Army.

Officer (OBE)
Civil division
 Anthony Gordon Benfell – of Auckland. For services to singing.
 Ian Barry Brickell – of Coromandel. For services to pottery and ceramics.
 Beatrice Mary Joye Evans – of Palmerston North. For services to the Girl Guide movement.
 Edward Max Friedlander – of Dunedin. For services to the community.
 Dr James Ritchie Gilmour – of Auckland. For services to obstetrics and the community.
 George Winiata Henare – of Auckland. For services to the performing arts.
 John Anderson Jamieson – Deputy Commissioner, New Zealand Police.
 Professor Leslie Kay – of Russell. For services to electrical and electronic engineering.
 Fiona Judith Kidman – of Wellington. For services to literature.
 Dr Michael King – of Auckland. For services to literature.
 Bernard Keith Knowles – of Wellington. For services to the dairy and wool industries.
 Elsie Ngahuia McInnes – of Havelock North. For services to the community.
 Stanley Walter Alexander Ralston – of Wellington; Valuer-General, Department of Valuation. For public service.
 Gordon William Robert Sharrock – of Wanganui. For services to cycling.
 Alfred Edward Tarrant – of Wellington. For services to manufacturing.
 Robert John Todd  – of Christchurch. For services to trade union affairs and the community.
 Alan John Young – of Mount Maunganui. For services to the education of the deaf.

Military division
 Lieutenant-Colonel James Roland McGregor – Royal New Zealand Infantry Regiment (Territorial Force).
 Group Captain Peter James Hughan – Royal New Zealand Air Force.
 Group Captain Donald William Pawson  – Royal New Zealand Air Force.

Member (MBE)
Civil division
 Ralph Thomas Adams – of Trentham; lately director of the New Zealand Wildlife Service.
 Byron Buick-Constable – of Wellington. For services to the disabled.
 Robert Norman Byrne  – of Whakatāne. For services to the community.
 Eric Alexander Craies – of Auckland. For services to rowing.
 Peter McElwain Faulkner  – superintendent, New Zealand Police.
 Josephine Lynette Hartley – of Kawerau. For services to the community.
 George Stanley Derek Heather – of Hamilton. For services to local government.
 Marie Alice Hopkins – of Christchurch. For services to the community.
 Edward Patrick Hoult – of Lower Hutt. For services to education.
 George Bendigo Hurst – of Tākaka. For services to dairy industry and the community.
 Dr David Edward Kirk – of Oxford, England. For services to rugby.
 Stanley Arthur Lay – of New Plymouth. For services to sport.
 Christopher Paul MacDonald – of Auckland. For services to canoeing.
 Ngaire MacLean – of Dunedin. For services to the community.
 Lawrence Albert Mahoney – of Christchurch. For services to rugby.
 Heather Jean Matthews – of Auckland. For services to athletics.
 Elizabeth Carolyn Miller – of Invercargill. For services to the community.
 Thomas Parsonage – of Huntly. For services to sport and the community.
 Peter Anderson Smith – of Auckland. For services to the community.
 Dr Raymond Harry Spitz – of Auckland. For services to the Hebrew community.
 Victor Michael Sunde – of Auckland. For services to the fruit growing industry.
 John Henry Thorby  – of Tūrangi. For services to local government and the community.
 Grant Leonard Ridgway Tilly – of Wellington. For services to the theatre.
 Leslie Dawson Wright – of Martinborough. For services to local government.

Military division
 Warrant Officer Kenneth William Last-Harris – Royal New Zealand Navy.
 Major Jessie Muriel Mary Gunn – Royal New Zealand Corps of Transport.
 Warrant Officer Class I Denis John King – Royal New Zealand Infantry Regiment.
 Warrant Officer Cedric Crosse Shatter – Royal New Zealand Air Force.

British Empire Medal (BEM)
Military division
 Chief Petty Officer Kenneth John Cook – Royal New Zealand Navy.
 Staff Sergeant Matekino Pop Shelford – New Zealand Army.
 Flight Sergeant Dennis William Kelland – Royal New Zealand Air Force.

Companion of the Queen's Service Order (QSO)

For community service
 Margaret Dunmore – of Auckland.
 The Very Reverend Kenape Faletoese – of Wellington.
 Beverley Jean Morris – of Wellington.
 Diggeress Rangituatahi Te Kanawa – of Te Kūiti.
 Brian William Woodward – of Nelson.

For public services
 Bruce Craig Beetham – of Marton.
 Geoffrey John Geering  – of Ashburton.
 Warren Neil Hawkey – of Lower Hutt; lately Director-General and Surveyor-General, Department of Survey and Land Information.
 Dinah Holman – of Auckland.
 Daniel Mearns Holmes  – of Ōpunake.
 Edward Emanuel Isbey – of Auckland.
 Trevor Percival Kelly – of Auckland.
 Daniel Joseph Moran – of Kemang, Indonesia.
 Maxwell Keith Mynott Taylor – of Gisborne.

Queen's Service Medal (QSM)

For community service
 Antony Aylwin Baker – of Cape Jackson.
 Betty Baker – of Cape Jackson.
 Elva Lilian Bett – of Wellington.
 Richard George (Peter) Campbell – of Auckland.
 Bruce Edward Dawe – of Christchurch.
 Tiramate Frankie Dennis – of Auckland.
 Euan Evan Dunlop – of Christchurch.
 Margaret Rose Gadson – of Auckland.
 Kathleen Ruby Harris – of Nelson.
 Teripowai Pauline Higgins – of Wainuiomata.
 Philippa Sylvia Howden – of Masterton.
 Marion Rodger Gilchrist Kendrick – of Whakatāne.
 John Frederick George Lawson – of Christchurch.
 Pauline Patricia Leathem – of Christchurch.
 Elsie Maud Lloyd – of Raumati Beach.
 Christina McAnulty (Sister Christina) – of Christchurch.
 Margaret Clemance McEwen – of Timaru.
 Doreen Veronica McMahon – of Christchurch.
 Elizabeth June Meade – of Gisborne.
 Frank Ernest Leslie Mitchell – of Christchurch.
 Gertrude Harete (Kahu) Morrison – of Rotorua.
 Herbert David Mullon – of New Plymouth.
 Joyce Ellen Nicholson – of Levin.
 Robert Michael Bertram Oliver – of Wellington.
 Ramesh Unka Patel – of Auckland.
 Reginald John Perkins – of Plimmerton.
 Paekiomeka Joy Ruha – of Wellington.
 Clifford Smith – of Auckland.
 Leslie Andrews Strong – of Christchurch.
 Elia Taukifaga Tinielu – of Porirua.
 The Reverend Sampson Ngatiterauwawe Toia  – of Dargaville.
 Ray (Rade) Vuksich – of Auckland.
 Colin Vernon Wheeler – of Oamaru.
 Jeanie Wilson – of Wanganui.

For public services
 Alister Scott Abernethy  – of Lower Hutt.
 Ann Herangi Barham  – of Te Awamutu.
 Gordon David Bell – of Christchurch; deputy station rescue fire officer, Ministry of Transport.
 Myra Ringa Urunga Berghan – of Awanui.
 Selina Emily Burrage – of Christchurch.
 Jean Myrtle Caird – of Timaru.
 Jack Critchley – of Wellington; lately chief engineer surveyor and surveyor of ships, Ministry of Transport.
 Stanley Petrie Dawson – senior constable, New Zealand Police.
 Dorothy Millicent Dutton – of Auckland; clinical specialist, Middlemore Hospital.
 Maurice Christopher Eathorne – senior constable, New Zealand Police.
 Nell Elizabeth Ehau – of Auckland.
 The Reverend Lawrence Albert Grosse – of Auckland.
 Geoffrey Robert Hammond – of Whangaparaoa.
 William Alfred Hart  – of Ashburton.
 Beryl Ena Kelly – of Auckland.
 James Alistair Lindsay – of Mosgiel.
 Frederick Mangnall – of Auckland.
 Brian Ignatius Maybury – of Auckland; head chauffeur, Public Service Garage, NZ Post Ltd, Auckland.
 Annie May Meadowcroft  – of Christchurch.
 Kathleen May Munro – of Port Chalmers.
 Moeroa O Daniela Iti (Rangi) Oberg  – of Christchurch.
 Amusia Patea – of Atafu, Tokelau.
 Lyndsay John Proctor – senior constable, New Zealand Police.
 Ngaire Winifred Quennell – of Dunedin.
 Professor Emeritus Ernest Johnstone Searle  – of Whangaparaoa.
 Terence Henry Small – of Manurewa.
 Robert William Stanic  – of Whangaparaoa.
 Archie Cooper Taylor  – of Oamaru.
 William MacDonald Taylor – of Waimamaku.
 Basil Phillip Vertongen – of Foxton.
 John Patrick Wilson – of Marton.
 Helen Mary Wily – of Christchurch.

Queen's Fire Service Medal (QFSM)
 Desmond Ernest Hide – district commander and chief fire officer, Cust Volunteer Fire Brigade, New Zealand Fire Service.
 Barrie Maxwell O'Donnell – senior station officer, Volunteer Section, Palmerston North Fire Brigade, New Zealand Fire Service.
 Walter West – fire commander, National Headquarters, New Zealand Fire Service.

Queen's Police Medal (QPM)
 Anthony Miles Letica – inspector, New Zealand Police.

References

New Year Honours
1988 awards
1988 in New Zealand
New Zealand awards